Licking Township may refer to one of the following places in the United States:

Licking Township, Crawford County, Illinois
Licking Township, Blackford County, Indiana
Licking Township, Licking County, Ohio
Licking Township, Muskingum County, Ohio
Licking Township, Clarion County, Pennsylvania

Township name disambiguation pages